Judge Barrett may refer to:

Amy Coney Barrett (born 1972), judge of the United States Court of Appeals for the Seventh Circuit before serving on the United States Supreme Court
James E. Barrett (1922–2011), judge of the United States Court of Appeals for the Tenth Circuit
Max Barrett (judge) (born 1971), judge of the High Court of Ireland
Michael R. Barrett (born 1951), judge of the United States District Court for the Southern District of Ohio
Stephen Barrett (Irish politician) (1913–1976), Irish circuit court judge for Sligo and later for Galway
William H. Barrett (1866–1941), judge of the United States District Court for the Southern District of Georgia

See also
Justice Barrett (disambiguation)